Doris Pack (born 18 March 1942, Schiffweiler) is a German politician, President of EPP Women, President of the Robert Schuman Institute and former Member of the European Parliament 1989–2014. She served as a member of the Bundestag 1974–1983 and 1985–1989. She is a member of the conservative Christian Democratic Union, part of the European People's Party. Pack is the chair of the EU Committee on Culture and Education (since 2009).

She is chair of the Franco-German Foundation for Cultural Cooperation, president of the European Children's Book Fair Association, member of the ZDF Television Council, president of the Saar Adult Education Association, vice-president of the European Movement on the Saar. She also is president of Women in the EPP and executive member of the European People's Party. She was a member of the Parliamentary Assembly of the Council of Europe and of the Assembly of the Western European Union (1981–1983 and 1985–1989). She is chairwoman of the advisory board of A Soul for Europe.

She graduated from teaching college in 1965 and worked as a teacher in primary schools until 1974. From 1983 to 1985, she was employed by the Saarland Ministry of Education. In 2007 she got honoris causa doctorate at University of Zadar (Croatia).

References

External links

Official website 
Doris Pack, Chair of the EU Committee on Culture and Education filmneweurope.com, June 13, 2014

1942 births
Living people
MEPs for Germany 2004–2009
Christian Democratic Union of Germany MEPs
MEPs for Germany 1999–2004
MEPs for Germany 2009–2014
20th-century women MEPs for Germany
21st-century women MEPs for Germany
Officers Crosses of the Order of Merit of the Federal Republic of Germany
Recipients of the Order of Skanderbeg (1990–)